The 2010 SUM U-17 Cup is the fourth edition of this tournament. The tournament began on July 23, 2010 and ran through July 29, 2010. All 16 MLS Academy teams participated in this tournament, with the winner of the tournament advancing to play in next year's prestigious Torneo Quixote youth tournament in Spain and the runner up joining the SuperGroup of the Dallas Cup.

Format

The tournament was organized as 4 groups of 4, with each team playing each other team once in their respective groups. Games consist of two 30 or 35 minute halves.  Ties are broken by penalty shots, with the loser earning one point and the winner two. The winner of each group will advance to the semi-finals, and the winners to the finals.

3- Points for a win
2- Points for a shootout win
1- Point for a shootout loss
0- Points for a regulation loss

Group A

Group B

Group C

Group D

Semi-finals

Final

2010 domestic association football cups
2010 Major League Soccer season
SUM U-17 Cup